Parkland College is a post-secondary educational institution in Saskatchewan, Canada.

History and governance
The Parkland College was founded by the Province of Saskatchewan in 1971 as Parkland Regional College (1973-2008). It was renamed Parkland College (2008). The college primarily serves the education and training needs of communities and industry partners in east central Saskatchewan and western Manitoba.

The college is in a coalition with Cumberland College (Saskatchewan), which is located in Northeast Saskatchewan. The coalition shares a president and CEO is focused on improving operational efficiencies (resource use) and enhancing organization effectiveness (impact). Each of the two colleges has its own board of six governors, but the same six governors sit on each board.

Programs
Parkland College offers adult basic education (ABE) and work essential skills training; college programming (business and industry; health care; computer training; general interest); and university programming. The college provides career counselling to students and other support services to help them be successful.

ABE training enables students to obtain a Grade-12 equivalent certificate, which facilitates transition to either post-secondary education or employment. Work essential skills are needed for success in work, learning and life; they are the foundational skills that make it easier to learn all other skills.

College programs are brokered from institutions such as Saskatchewan Polytechnic, Lakeland College (Alberta) and Conestoga College (Ontario) and other institute certificate programs. Select university programs are offered at the undergraduate and graduate level in partnership with the University of Saskatchewan and University of Regina.

Through its wholly owned subsidiary, Western Trades Training Institute (WTTI), Parkland offers Crane and Hoist certification, Boom truck certification, and rigging programs.

Campuses
The college has locations in Canora; Esterhazy; Fort Qu'Appelle; Kamsack; Melville; and two in Yorkton (the college's Main Campus and the Trades and Technology Centre).

Research 
Parkland College has a strong agricultural research program in crop science and production that it operates in collaboration with the East Central Research Foundation . The program is funded by industry, producers and government agencies such as the Natural Sciences and Engineering Research Council.

The college has also received funding from the Social Sciences and Humanities Research Council.

Partnerships
Parkland College offers accredited post-secondary education and skills training opportunities for local learners in partnership with the University of Regina, the University of Saskatchewan, Saskatchewan Polytechnic, and the province's other regional colleges.

Parkland College maintains reciprocal arrangements with educational partners, including:
Dumont Technical Institute 
First Nations University of Canada 
Saskatchewan Indian Institute of Technologies 
Saskatchewan Polytechnic 
University of Regina  
University of Saskatchewan

See also
Higher education in Saskatchewan
List of agricultural universities and colleges
List of colleges and universities in Saskatchewan

References

External links

 

Education in Saskatchewan
University of Saskatchewan
Educational institutions established in 1973
Vocational education in Canada
1973 establishments in Saskatchewan